"Toki wa Kagerō" (Japanese: 時はかげろう) is the sixth and final single by Carlos Toshiki & Omega Tribe released by Warner Pioneer on June 25, 1990. It is the band's only single after transferring to Warner Pioneer from VAP, with Warner Pioneer re-releasing all Carlos Toshiki & Omega Tribe songs and albums under the label. This song was written by singer Yumi Matsutoya, with Matsutoya covering it with her album Tengoku no Door the same year. Carlos Toshiki, the band's singer, uses the Portuguese words "ilusão" and "solidão" in the lyrics, meaning "illusion" and "solitude," while Matsutoya sings it in English. The song's B-side, "Tsūauto Furubēsu", was composed by the band's guitarist, Shinji Takashima, and written by Yasuharu Konishi.

Track listing

Charts

References 

Omega Tribe (Japanese band) songs
1990 songs
1990 singles